Nat Bailey Stadium, also known as The Nat, is a baseball stadium in Vancouver, British Columbia. It is home to the Vancouver Canadians of the Northwest League High-A.

Stadium history
The stadium is located in Hillcrest Park immediately north-east of Queen Elizabeth Park in the Riley Park-Little Mountain neighbourhood of Vancouver. It replaced Athletic Park, which had opened in 1913. Originally built in 1951 as Capilano Stadium, it was renamed Nat Bailey Stadium in 1978 for Vancouver restaurateur (and founder of the White Spot restaurant chain) Nat Bailey after his death to honour his tireless effort to promote baseball in Vancouver. On June 16, 2010, Scotiabank and the Vancouver Canadians announced a naming rights agreement that led to the name Scotiabank Field at Nat Bailey Stadium until that agreement ended in 2019 and the stadium reverted to its prior name.

The stadium was first home to the Vancouver Capilanos in the early 1950s and later attracted the Oakland Oaks, who became the Vancouver Mounties of the Class AAA Pacific Coast League, from 1956 to 1962, and 1965 through 1969.  The PCL returned to Vancouver in 1978 with the Vancouver Canadians, owned by Harry Ornest. He purchased most of the primary assets of Sick's Stadium in Seattle and shipped them north for use at Nat Bailey. The Canadians stayed in Vancouver through the 1999 season, then relocated south to Sacramento, California. The following season, a second incarnation of the Canadians began playing in the short-season Class A Northwest League and now play in Class High-A.

The stadium's capacity is 6,500 and as of 2019 they led the short-season A clubs in attendance and outdrew Vancouver's AAA team. Their major league affiliation remains with the Blue Jays.

The Canadians ownership signed a long term lease at Scotiabank Field at Nat Bailey Stadium in February 2007. They have significantly improved and modernized the stadium while also restoring parts of the park to their original 1951 condition.

Bud Kerr Baseball Museum
The Bud Kerr Baseball Museum is located inside Nat Bailey Stadium. The museum, which opened on June 18, 2008, is dedicated to the more than sixty years of baseball that have been played in that stadium. The museum is named for Bud Kerr, the team's official historian until his death in 2009, and celebrates the players who have spent some of their careers there including: Rich Harden, Sammy Sosa, and Tim Raines, who helped open the museum.

In fiction
The stadium was used as the home of the fictional Santa Barbara Seabirds Class A Minor League Baseball team in the "Dead Man's Curveball" episode of the television series Psych.  It was also used as the home of the fictional Seacouver Chiefs in the "Manhunt" episode of Highlander: The Series. It's also the setting for a scene between MacGyver and Reggie Jackson in the MacGyver episode "Squeeze Play".

References

External links
Vancouver Canadians
UBC Thunderbirds baseball
Nat Bailey Stadium

Baseball venues in British Columbia
Minor league baseball venues
Sports venues in Vancouver
Sports venues completed in 1951
1951 establishments in British Columbia
University sports venues in Canada
Northwest League ballparks